Dichagyris pfeifferi is a moth of the family Noctuidae. It is found in eastern and south-eastern Turkey, Iran and Israel.

Adults are on wing from August to October. There is one generation per year.

External links
 Noctuinae of Israel

pfeifferi
Insects of Turkey
Moths of the Middle East
Moths described in 1933